Tandavapura is a railway station on Mysore–Chamarajanagar branch line.
The station is located in Mysore district, Karnataka state, India.

Location
Tandavapura railway station is located near Thandavapura village in Mysore district.

History 
The project cost . The gauge conversion work of the  stretch was completed.
There are six trains running forward and backward in this route.  Five of them are slow moving passenger trains.

References

Railway stations in Mysore district